Sir Rama Varma XIV KCSI (1848–1888) was the ruler of the Kingdom of Cochin from 1864 to 1888. He was the first Maharajah of Cochin to be knighted.

Reign 

Rama Varma was the nephew of his predecessor Ravi Varma IV. Rama Varma was an extremely weak monarch and was afflicted by illness throughout his reign. The administration was handled mostly by his Diwans - T. Sankunni Menon till 1879 and his brother T. Govinda Menon from 1879 onwards. Govinda Menon arranged a meeting between Rama Varma XIV and the Maharaja of Travancore at Thiruvananthapuram and Tripunithara. Rama Varma attended upon the Prince of Wales Albert Edward at Madras in 1876, during his visit to India. Rama Varma built the Puthen Bungalow and Mani Malika at Thrippunithura.

Death 

Rama Varma died at Thrippunithura in July 1888.

Honours 

In acknowledgement of his loyalty to the British Crown, Rama Varma was made a Knight Commander of the Order of the Star of India.

References 

 

1848 births
1888 deaths
Knights Commander of the Order of the Star of India
Rulers of Cochin